Gelechia delodectis is a moth of the family Gelechiidae. It is found in China (Yunnan).

References

Moths described in 1938
Gelechia